Mohannad Qasim (born 1 July 1990) is an Iraqi football goalkeeper who currently plays for Al-Najaf in Iraq and the Iraq national football team.

References

External links
 

Sportspeople from Baghdad
Iraqi footballers
Iraq international footballers
Association football goalkeepers
Living people
1990 births
Al-Shorta SC players